Langewahl is a municipality in the Oder-Spree district, in Brandenburg, Germany.

Nearby are the Dubrower Berge a range of wooded hills popular with hikers and cyclists.

Demography

References

Localities in Oder-Spree